Leiningen-Westerburg was an historic state of the Holy Roman Empire, located in the vicinity of Leiningen and Westerburg in what is now the German state of Rhineland-Palatinate.

Westerburg-Leiningen-Leiningen was formed in 1547 when, upon the death of Kuno, Count of Leiningen-Westerburg, Leiningen-Westerburg was divided into Westerburg-Leiningen-Leiningen and Westerburg-Leiningen-Westerburg.

Rulers

See also 
 Barony of Westerburg

Counties of the Holy Roman Empire
Leiningen family
1547 establishments in the Holy Roman Empire